Acianthera juxtaposita is a species of orchid plant native to Panama.

References 

juxtaposita
Flora of Panama